The President's Intelligence Advisory Board (PIAB) is an advisory body to the Executive Office of the President of the United States. According to its self-description, it "provides advice to the President concerning the quality and adequacy of intelligence collection, of analysis and estimates, of counterintelligence, and of other intelligence activities."

The PIAB, through its Intelligence Oversight Board (IOB), also advises the President on the legality of foreign intelligence activities.

History 
In January 1956 President Dwight D. Eisenhower created the agency, originally known as the President's Board of Consultants on Foreign Intelligence Activities (PBCFIA). The first board under chair James Killian were:

Richard Conolly
Jimmy Doolittle
Benjamin Fairless
John Hull
Joseph P. Kennedy
Robert Lovett
Edward Ryerson

In May 1961, President John F. Kennedy renamed it to the President's Foreign Intelligence Advisory Board (PFIAB).
The board exists at the pleasure of the President, who can change its size and portfolio so in 1977 President Jimmy Carter abolished the PFIAB, but President Ronald Reagan re-established it later.

On February 29, 2008, President George W. Bush renamed the agency to its present form.

Most of the board's work is secret, but one very public investigation involved the loss of U.S. nuclear secrets to China from the Los Alamos National Laboratory during the 1990s.

Intelligence Oversight Board
President Gerald Ford created the IOB following a 1975–76 investigation by the US Congress into domestic spying, assassination operations, and other abuses by intelligence agencies. His executive order doing so went into effect on March 1, 1976. In 1993, the IOB became a committee of the PFIAB, under Executive Order #12863 of President Bill Clinton.

One of the IOB's functions is to examine violations of the laws and directives governing clandestine surveillance. The IOB received quarterly and annual reports from most US intelligence activities. Thirteen cases involving FBI actions between 2002 and 2004 were referred to the IOB for its review.

In an executive order issued on February 29, 2008, President George W. Bush terminated the IOB's authority to oversee the general counsel and inspector general of each U.S. intelligence agency, and erased the requirement that each inspector general file a report with the IOB every three months. The order also removed the IOB's authority to refer a matter to the Justice Department for a criminal investigation, and directed the IOB to notify the president of a problem only if other officials are not already "adequately" addressing that problem.

In August 2013 it was reported that the membership of the IOB had been reduced from 14 to 4 under President Barack Obama, possibly starting in early May at the beginning of the 2013 mass surveillance disclosures by Edward Snowden. The membership had not been increased as of July 2014.

Membership 

During the administration of President George W. Bush, the PIAB had 16 members selected from among distinguished citizens outside the government who were qualified "on the basis of achievement, experience, independence, and integrity." The members were not paid.

PIAB membership is generally considered public information; for example, the Clinton Administration posted the names of the members on a PFIAB web page, and the Trump Administration issued a press release announcing the nominations of new members.

PFIAB Membership under George W. Bush
In August 2002, Randy Deitering, the executive director of PFIAB, confirmed the membership list released by the White House press office in October 2001:
Brent Scowcroft, the chair
Pete Wilson, former governor of California
Cresencio S. Arcos, Jr., AT&T executive and former US ambassador
Jim Barksdale, former head of the internet company Netscape
Robert Addison Day, chairman of the TWC Group, a money management firm
Stephen Friedman, past chairman of Goldman Sachs
Alfred Lerner, chief executive of MBNA
Ray Lee Hunt, scion of the Texas oil fortune
Rita Hauser, lawyer
David E. Jeremiah, retired admiral
Arnold Kanter, national security official in the George H. W. Bush administration and a founding member of the Scowcroft Group
James C. Langdon, Jr., a power-lawyer in Texas
Elisabeth Pate-Cornell, chair of Management Science and Engineering at Stanford University
John Harrison Streicker, real estate magnate
Philip Zelikow, National Security Council staffer during the George H.W. Bush administration and later a counselor to Secretary of State Condoleezza Rice
In 2003, there were indications of spying on members of the board by a foreign intelligence asset.

PIAB Membership under Barack Obama
The entire PIAB membership that served under the administration of George W. Bush resigned as part of an agreed-upon move in the presidential transition of Barack Obama.

President Obama appointed Chuck Hagel, former United States Senator from Nebraska, and current University of Oklahoma President David Boren as PIAB co-chairs.

The following other members were appointed to the board under President Obama:

Roel Campos
Richard Danzig appointed on December 1, 2010
Lee H. Hamilton
Rita Hauser
Paul G. Kaminski
Ellen Laipson, president and CEO of the Henry L. Stimson Center
Les Lyles
Daniel Meltzer appointed on December 1, 2010
Jami Miscik appointed December 23, 2009
Mona Sutphen appointed on September 6, 2011
Philip Zelikow appointed on September 6, 2011
Tom Wheeler appointed on April 27, 2011

In May 2013, the White House dismissed 10 members of the board. The four remaining members of the PIAB were:
Richard Danzig
Daniel Meltzer
Jami Miscik
Mona Sutphen

In August 2014, President Obama nominated six new members:
James S. Crown
Scott Davis
Jamie Dos Santos
Julius Genachowski
Shirley Ann Jackson
Neal Wolin

PIAB Membership under Donald Trump
President Donald Trump named the following persons to the PIAB:
Steve Feinberg, chair
Samantha Ravich, vice chair
Safra Catz
Saxby Chambliss
Jim Donovan
Kevin Hulbert
Jeremy Katz
David Robertson

In February 2019, President Trump named three additional members:
Charles E. Allen
Daniel Hoffman
John K. Hurley

In May 2019, President Trump named Ray Washburne as an additional member.

PIAB Membership under Joe Biden 
In May 2022, President Joe Biden named the below persons to the PIAB.

 Sandy Winnefeld
 Gilman Louie
 Janet Napolitano
 Richard Verma

In June 2022, he named Evan Bayh to the PIAB.

In October 2022, he named Anne Finucane to the PIAB.

In November 2022, he named Mark Angelson to the PIAB.

In January 2023, he named Margaret Hamburg, Kim Cobb, and Kneeland Youngblood to the PIAB.

PIAB Chairs 
PIAB chairpersons have been:

IOB Chairs
These are chairs of the Advisory Board's committee of Intelligence Oversight Board

Board executive directors
1956–1959: John Cassidy
1959–1961, 1961–1970: Patrick Coyne
1970–1973: Gerard Burke
1973–1977: Wheaton Byers
1977: Lionel Olmer
1977–1981: Board abolished
1981–1983: Norman Wood
1983–1984: Fred Demech
1984–1988: Gary Schmitt
1988–1989: Fred Demech
1989–1991: Nina Stewart
1991–1992: Vacant
1992–1995: Eugene Yeates
1995–2003: Randy Deitering 
2003–2005: Joan Dempsey
2005–2017: Stefanie Osburn

Board members

David Abshire: 1981–1983
Stephen Ailes: 1976–1977 (IOB)
Lew Allen: 1990–1999 (IOB)
Brooke Anderson: 2015–present
George Anderson: 1969–1970; 1976–1977
Martin Anderson: 1982–1985
Cresencio Arcos: 1999–2003
Leslie Arends: 1976–1977
Anne Legendre Armstrong: 1981–1990, Chairman
Zoë Baird: 1993–2001
Howard Baker: 1985–1987; 1988–1990
William Baker: 1959–1961; 1961–1977; 1981–1990
Jim Barksdale: 2001–2009
Robert Barrow: 1984–1985
Richard Bloch: 1996–1998
Alfred Bloomingdale: 1981–1982
David Boren: 2009–2013 (IOB)
Frank Borman: 1981–1982
Denis Bovin: 2006–2010
Omar Bradley: 1956
William Brody: 2002–2005
David Bruce: 1956–1957
Shelby Bryan: 1999–2001
Zbigniew Brzezinski: 1988–1990
Glenn Campbell: 1981–1990 (IOB)
Roel Campos: 2009–2013
Ann Caracristi: 1993–2001 (IOB)
Bill Casey: 1976–1977
Leo Cherne: 1973–1976 (IOB, 1976–1977); Vice Chair, 1981–1990
Clark Clifford: 1961–1963
John Connally: 1970–1971; 1972–1975; 1976–1977; 1981–1983
Richard Conolly: 1956–1961
Jim Crown: 2014–present
Arthur Culvahouse: 2005–2010
Richard Danzig: 2010–present (IOB, 2010–2015)
Colgate Darden: 1957–1961
Scott Davis: 2014–2015
Robert Day: 2001–2005
John Deutch: 1990–1993
William DeWitt: 2005–2010
Jimmy Doolittle: 1956–1961; 1961–1964
Jamie Dos Santos: 2014–present
Sidney Drell: 1993–2001
Thomas Eagleton: 1993–2000
James Ellis: 2005–2009
Donald Evans: 2005–2009
Martin Faga: 2005–2009
Benjamin Fairless: 1956–1959
Marty Feldstein: 2006–2009
Michèle Flournoy: 2014–present
John Foster: 1973–1977; 1981–1990
Steve Friedman: 1999–2005; 2009–2010
Bob Galvin: 1973–1977
Julius Genachowski: 2014–present (IOB)
Al Gore: 1977–1981 (IOB)
Gordon Gray: 1961–1977
Alan Greenspan: 1982–1985
James Hamilton: 1995–1997
Lee Hamilton: 2005–2013
Anthony Harrington: 1993–2000 (IOB); Vice Chair, 1997–2000
Rita Hauser: 2001–2004 (IOB, 2003–2004); 2009–2013
Robert Hermann: 1993–2001
John Hull: 1956–1958
Ray Hunt: 2001–2009
William Hyland: 1990–1993
Bobby Inman: Vice Chair, 1990–1991
Leon Jaworski: 1981–1982
Shirley Jackson: 2014–present (IOB)
David Jeremiah: 2001–2010 (IOB, 2003–2009)
Amos Jordan: 1990–1993 (IOB, not PIAB)
Paul Kaminski: 2009–2013
Arnold Kanter: 2001–2005 (IOB, 2003–2005)
Joe Kennedy: 1956
James Killian: 1958–1960
Jeane Kirkpatrick: 1985–1990
Henry Kissinger: 1984–1990
Ellen Laipson: 2009–2013
Edwin Land: 1961–1977
Jim Langdon: 2001–2005 (IOB, 2003–2005)
William Langer: 1961–1969
Tony Lapham: 1991–1993 (IOB; not PIAB)
Lyman Lemnitzer: 1976–1977
Al Lerner: 2001–2002
Franklin Lincoln: 1969–1972
Robert Lovett: 1956–1961
Clare Luce: 1973–1977; 1981–1987
Gordon Luce: 1988–1989
Lester Lyles: 2009–2013 (IOB)
Michael McConnell: 1988–1990 (IOB; not PIAB)
Dan Meltzer: 2010–2015 (IOB)
Charles Meyers: 1982–1988 (IOB; not PIAB)
Jami Miscik: 2009–2015 (IOB)
Thomas Moorer: 1981–1985
Michael Morell: 2013–2014
John Morrison: 2005–2010
Franklin Murphy: 1969–1972
Robert Murphy: 1961–1973; 1976–1977 (IOB)
Kevin Nealer: 2014–present
Peter O'Donnell: 1981–1985
Frank Pace: 1961–1972
Elisabeth Paté-Cornell: 2001–2010
Ross Perot: 1981–1985
William Perry: 1990–1993
Hal Pote: 1993–1996 (IOB)
Lois Rice: 1993–2001
Chuck Robb: 2005–2009
Nelson Rockefeller: 1969–1974
Joe Rodgers: 1981–1985
Eugene Rostow: 1982–1985
Warren Rudman: Vice Chair, 1993–1994; Vice Chair, 1995–1998
Edward Ryerson: 1956–1961
Jack Schmitt: 1983–1985
Bernie Schriever: 1985–1990
Paul Seabury: 1981–1985
Bill Scranton: 1977–1981 (IOB)
George Shultz: 1974–1976
Stanley Shuman: 1995–2001
John Sides: 1965–1969
Robert Six: 1981–1985
William Smith: 1985–1990
Maurice Sonnenberg: 1992–2000
Frank Stella: 1981–1982 (IOB; not PIAB)
Bobby Stein: 2015–present
John Streicker: 2001–2005
Mona Sutphen: 2011–present (IOB)
Max Taylor: 1961; 1965–1968
Edward Teller: 1971–1977
John Tower: 1987–1990
Fran Townsend: 2008–2009
Charles Tyroler: 1981–1990 (IOB; not PIAB)
Caspar Weinberger: 1988–1990
Seymour Weiss: 1981–1985
Tom Wheeler: 2011–2013
Bud Wheelon: 1983–1988
Ed Williams: 1976–1977; 1981–1985
James Wilson: 1985–1990
Pete Wilson: 2001–2005
Albert Wohlstetter: 1985–1990
Neal Wolin: 2014–present (IOB)
Philip Zelikow: 2001–2003; 2011–2013
Bud Zumwalt: 1996–2000

See also
Team B
Privacy and Civil Liberties Oversight Board

References

External links

United States federal boards, commissions, and committees
Executive Office of the President of the United States
1956 establishments in the United States
American advisory organizations
United States intelligence agencies
Intelligence analysis agencies